Crow Black Chicken is a three-piece blues-rock band from Cork and Clonmel, Ireland composed of Christy O'Hanlon (vocals, guitar), Stephen McGrath (bass) and Gev Barrett (drums, vocals). Described as 'The hardest working band in Ireland', Crow Black Chicken has continued to build a following now known as the 'Crow Black Chicken Army'. Invited as guests to 'Electric Picnic' each and every year, their unique style of original music envelopes southern American blues-rock influence.

History (2009 - present)
Crow Black Chicken formed in 2009, releasing their début album Electric Soup in 2012 and second album Rumble Shake in June 2014 which charted in the Irish Albums Chart at number 12 in its first week of being released.

Members
 Christy O'Hanlon – Lead vocals, guitar
 Stephen McGrath – Bass 
 Gev Barrett - Drums, percussion, vocals

Discography

Albums

Studio albums

Live albums

Singles

References

External links
 

2009 establishments in Ireland
Musical groups established in 2009
Irish musical trios